Dominic Manuel Núñez (January 17, 1995) is an American professional baseball catcher in the Chicago Cubs organization. Núñez was drafted by the Colorado Rockies in the sixth round of the 2013 Major League Baseball draft, and made his MLB debut in 2019.

Amateur career
Núñez was drafted by the Rockies in the sixth round of the 2013 Major League Baseball draft out of Elk Grove High School in Elk Grove, California, for whom he had played shortstop on the baseball team. He committed to play college baseball at UCLA, but chose to sign with the Rockies instead of attending college.

Professional career

Colorado Rockies
After signing with the Rockies, he was assigned to the Grand Junction Rockies to begin his professional career; he spent the whole 2013 season there, batting .200/.269/.323 in 195 at bats with 24 runs, three home runs, and 23 RBIs in 55 games, while primarily playing second base and shortstop. He returned to Grand Junction in 2014 and greatly improved, slashing .313/.384/.517 in 176 at bats with eight home runs and 40 RBIs in 46 games, while playing catcher. 

In 2015, he played for the Asheville Tourists where he batted .282/.373/.448 in 373 at bats with 61 runs, 13 home runs, and 53 RBIs in 104 games, as on defense he caught 21% of runners. Núñez spent 2016 with the Modesto Nuts where he batted .241/.321/.362 in 390 at bats with ten home runs and 51 RBIs in 105 games, as on defense he caught 43% of runners.  He was named a 2015 MiLB.com Organization All-Star.

He played in 2017 with the Hartford Yard Goats where he batted .202/.335/.354 with 37 runs, 11 home runs, and 28 RBIs in 95 games. In 2018, he returned to Hartford, batting .222/.320/.343 in 377 at bats with nine home runs and 42 RBIs in 92 games. He began 2019 with the Albuquerque Isotopes.

On August 13, 2019, the Rockies selected Núñez's contract and promoted him to the major leagues. He made his debut that night versus the Arizona Diamondbacks, and hit a home run off Yoan López for his first MLB hit.

In 2019 with Albuquerque, he batted .244/.362/.559 in 213 at bats, with 43 runs, 14 doubles, 17 home runs, and 42 RBIs. He was named a 2015 MiLB.com Organization All-Star.  With the Rockies he batted 7-for-43.

While Núñez did not appear in a game for the Rockies in the shortened 2020 season, he was named to the team's 2021 Opening Day roster. He served as the Rockies backup catcher throughout the season, hitting .189/.293/.399 in 288 at bats, with 10 home runs and 33 RBIs in 81 games.  

In 2022 with Albuquerque, he batted .223/.319/.360 in 247 at bats, with 39 runs, five home runs, and 29 RBIs, as on defense he caught 22% of runners.  With the Rockies, he batted 4-for-33.

San Francisco Giants
On November 9, 2022, Núñez was claimed off waivers by the San Francisco Giants. On November 18, he was non tendered and became a free agent.

Chicago Cubs
On January 3, 2023, Nunez signed a minor league deal with the Chicago Cubs.

References

External links

1995 births
Living people
Sportspeople from Elk Grove, California
Baseball players from California
Major League Baseball catchers
Colorado Rockies players
Grand Junction Rockies players
Asheville Tourists players
Modesto Nuts players
Hartford Yard Goats players
Albuquerque Isotopes players
Salt River Rafters players